The women's solo was one of two events in the Synchronised swimming program at the 1988 Summer Olympics. The final was held on 30 September  1988.

Results

Technical figures

Qualification

Final

References

Synchronized swimming at the 1988 Summer Olympics
1988 in synchronized swimming
1988 in women's sport
Women's events at the 1988 Summer Olympics